Kasler is a surname of Germanic origins. Today, the Kasler surname is most commonly found in Hungary, Northern Italy, the former Yugoslavia and Romania.

Notable people with the surname include:

Miklós Kásler (born 1950), Hungarian oncologist, professor, director of the National Institute of Oncology, Minister of Human Resources of Hungary
Horst Käsler (1926–1987), German handball player
James H. Kasler (1926–2014), American military personnel